Birtle is a former provincial electoral division in Manitoba, Canada.

Birtle was established in 1881, following the western expansion of the province's boundaries.  It was located in the central western region of the province, near Roblin and Russell.  It was eliminated for the 1886 provincial election, but re-established for the 1888 election.

For most of its history, Birtle was safe for the Liberal and Liberal-Progressive parties.  The constituency was abolished with the 1958 election, with much of its territory going to the new constituency of Birtle-Russell.

Provincial representatives

Former provincial electoral districts of Manitoba
1881 establishments in Manitoba
1886 disestablishments in Manitoba
1888 establishments in Manitoba
1958 disestablishments in Manitoba